Earl of Eglinton is a title in the Peerage of Scotland. It was created by James IV of Scotland in 1507 for Hugh Montgomerie, 3rd Lord Montgomerie.

In 1859, the thirteenth Earl of Eglinton, Archibald Montgomerie, was also created Earl of Winton in the Peerage of the United Kingdom, which gave him an automatic seat in the House of Lords, and both earldoms have been united since. Furthermore, other titles held with the earldoms are: Lord Montgomerie (created 1449), Baron Ardrossan (1806) and Baron Seton and Tranent (1859). The first is in the Peerage of Scotland, while the latter two are in the Peerage of the United Kingdom.

William Dunbar mentions a Sir Hugh of Eglinton in his Lament for the Makaris, citing him as a fellow poet. He has sometimes been tentatively identified as Huchown, but this is not certain.

The Earl of Eglinton is the hereditary Clan Chief of Clan Montgomery. The ancestral seat was Eglinton Castle in Kilwinning, North Ayrshire.

Lords Montgomerie (1449)
Alexander Montgomerie, 1st Lord Montgomerie (died c. 1470)
Alexander Montgomerie, Master of Montgomerie (1404–1452)
Alexander Montgomerie, 2nd Lord Montgomerie (died c. 1483)
Hugh Montgomerie, 3rd Lord Montgomerie (c. 1460–1545) (created Earl of Eglinton in 1507)

Earls of Eglinton (1507)
Hugh Montgomerie, 1st Earl of Eglinton (c. 1460–1545)
Hugh Montgomerie, 2nd Earl of Eglinton (died 1546)
Hugh Montgomerie, 3rd Earl of Eglinton (c. 1531–1585)
Hugh Montgomerie, 4th Earl of Eglinton (1563–1586)
Hugh Montgomerie, 5th Earl of Eglinton (died 1612)
Alexander Montgomerie, 6th Earl of Eglinton (1588–1661)
Hugh Montgomerie, 7th Earl of Eglinton (1613–1669)
Alexander Montgomerie, 8th Earl of Eglinton (died 1701)
Alexander Montgomerie, 9th Earl of Eglinton (c. 1660–1729)
Alexander Montgomerie, 10th Earl of Eglinton (1723–1769)
Archibald Montgomerie, 11th Earl of Eglinton (1726–1796)
Hugh Montgomerie, 12th Earl of Eglinton (1739–1819)
Archibald William Montgomerie, 13th Earl of Eglinton, 1st Earl of Winton (1812–1861)
Archibald William Montgomerie, 14th Earl of Eglinton, 2nd Earl of Winton (1841–1892)
George Arnulph Montgomerie, 15th Earl of Eglinton, 3rd Earl of Winton (1848–1919)
Archibald Seton Montgomerie, 16th Earl of Eglinton, 4th Earl of Winton (1880–1945)
Archibald William Alexander Montgomerie, 17th Earl of Eglinton, 5th Earl of Winton (1914–1966)
Archibald George Montgomerie, 18th Earl of Eglinton, 6th Earl of Winton (1939–2018)
Hugh Archibald William Montgomerie, 19th Earl of Eglinton, 7th Earl of Winton (born 1966)

The heir apparent is the present holder's son, Rhuridh Seton Archibald Montgomerie, Lord Montgomerie (born 2007).

See also
Barony and Castle of Giffen
Eglinton Castle
Eglinton Country Park
Eglinton Tournament Bridge
Industry and the Eglinton Castle estate
Polnoon Castle
Robert Burns and the Eglinton Estate
Seagate Castle

References

Attribution

Further reading

 (9th Earl)
 (6th Earl)

External links
Video & commentary on Auchans House and Lady Susanna Montgomerie

 
Earldoms in the Peerage of Scotland
1449 establishments in Scotland
Noble titles created in 1508